Catharina Lysholm (1744 - 9 December 1815), was a Norwegian businesswoman and ship-owner.

Catharina Meincke Lysholm  was born at Trondheim in Trøndelag, Norway. She was the daughter of merchant and office holder Hilmar Meincke (1710–71) and Catharina Mølmann (1720–48). In 1763 she was married to merchant Broder Brodersen Lysholm (1734–1772), then one of the most successful merchants in Trondheim. Both her father and husband had originated from Flensburg in Southern Schleswig.

She acquired wealth through both inheritance and marriage. Her father was  co-owner of the copper works at Løkken and Røros, organized a West Indies company and operated a tobacco factory. Upon his death, she inherited the bulk of his estate. Upon the death of her spouse in 1772, she took over his business interests in partnership with Hans Carl Knudtzon who had moved to Trondheim from Bredstedt in North Frisia.

She managed the perhaps largest ship company in Trondheim from 1772-1779 operating under the name  Fru Agentinde Lysholm & Co. By 1779, she was one of the co-founders and owners of the city's shipyard at which time she pulled herself out of the company and Knudtzon became the sole owner.

She was a leading figure in the city's commercial life, and was honored by being saluted upon her return to the city after business trips. She participated in philanthropy, and erected several buildings, among them the manor at Havstein (1772), which became a center of the local upper class society.  A street at Ferstad in Trondheim district of Byåsen was named after her in 1986.

References

18th-century Norwegian businesswomen
18th-century Norwegian businesspeople
1744 births
1815 deaths
Norwegian businesspeople in shipping
Ship owners
Norwegian founders
Women founders
Norwegian shipbuilders
Norwegian people of German descent
19th-century Norwegian businesswomen
19th-century Norwegian businesspeople